Henry Wilson (1896–unknown) was an Irish footballer who played in the Football League for Charlton Athletic and Hull City.

References

1896 births
Irish association footballers (before 1923)
Association football midfielders
English Football League players
Lisburn Distillery F.C. players
Belfast Celtic F.C. players
Glenavon F.C. players
Hull City A.F.C. players
Charlton Athletic F.C. players
Aberaman Athletic F.C. players
Linfield F.C. players
Larne F.C. players
Year of death missing